Newenham may refer to:

People
Thomas Newenham Deane (1828–1899), Irish architect
Edward Newenham (1734–1814), Irish politician
William Newenham Montague Orpen KBE, RA, RHA (1878–1931), Irish artist
John Newenham Summerson CH CBE (1904–1992), British architectural historian
George Newenham Wright (1794–1877), Irish writer and Anglican clergyman

Places
Newenham Abbey, Cistercian abbey founded in 1247 in Axminster, Devon, England
Cape Newenham LRRS Airport, military airstrip southeast of Cape Newenham, in the U.S. state of Alaska
Cape Newenham Air Force Station, closed United States Air Force General Surveillance Radar station

See also
Newnam
Newnham (disambiguation)